France participated in the Eurovision Song Contest 2022 in Turin, Italy, with "" performed by Alvan and Ahez. The French broadcaster  organised the national final  in order to select the French entry for the 2022 contest. Twelve songs competed in the national final on 5 March 2022, where the winner was selected over two rounds of voting.

Background 

The French national broadcaster, broadcasts the event within the country and delegates the selection of the nation's entry to the television channel . The French broadcaster has used both national finals and internal selection to choose the national entry in the past. The  and  French entries were selected via the national final , while in 2021, the new format  was used as the national selection.

Before Eurovision

Eurovision France, c'est vous qui décidez ! 
 ("Eurovision France, it's you who decide!") was the national final organised by France 2 to select France's entry for the Eurovision Song Contest 2022. The competition took place on 5 March 2022 at the France Télévisions studios in Saint-Denis, hosted by Stéphane Bern and Laurence Boccolini. The show was broadcast on France 2, TV5Monde and TV5 Québec Canada on a time delay as well as online via France Télévisions and TV5Monde's official websites france.tv and europe.tv5monde.com, respectively. The national final was watched by 1.47 million viewers in France with a market share of 8.8%.

Format 
The format of the national final consists of a live final on 5 March 2022 where the winner was selected over two rounds of voting. Twelve entries competed in the first round, from which five was selected exclusively by public televoting to advance to the second round, the superfinal. A ten-member Francophone and international jury panel then selected a wildcard entry from the remaining seven entries to proceed to the superfinal. In the superfinal, the winner was determined by the combination of public televoting (50%) and the ten-member jury panel (50%). The public and the juries each had a total of 420 points to award, with each jury member awarding 2, 4, 6, 8, 10 and 12 points to their top six entries. Viewers were able to vote via telephone and SMS voting which also accepted international votes, with the public vote awarding 20, 40, 60, 80, 100 and 120 points to their top six songs. The jury panel consisted of:

 Jenifer  – singer and actress
 Gjon's Tears – singer-songwriter, represented  in 
 Nicoletta – singer
 Cyril Féraud – television presenter
 Yseult – singer-songwriter and model
  – Spanish singer and comedian
 Élodie Gossuin – television presenter, co-host of the Junior Eurovision Song Contest 2021
 André Manoukian – jazz singer and former judge on 
 Joyce Jonathan – singer-songwriter
 Sundy Jules – YouTube personality

Competing entries 
France 2 opened a submission period on 21 June 2021 in order for interested artists and songwriters to submit their proposals through an online submission form up until the deadline on 24 October 2021. Songs were required to contain at least 70% French language or French regional language lyrics with a free language allowance for the remaining lyrics. At the closing of the deadline, the French broadcaster received 3,000 submissions. Auditions which featured entries shortlisted from the received submissions took place starting on 6 January 2022 at the Apollo Theatre in Paris, and the twelve entries selected to compete in the national final were announced on 16 February 2022.

Final 

The final took place on 5 March 2022. Twelve entries competed and the winner was selected over two rounds of voting. In the first round, the top five entries as determined exclusively by public televoting advanced to the second round, the superfinal. "" performed by Cyprien Zeni was awarded the wildcard by a Francophone and international ten-member jury panel from the remaining seven entries to proceed to the superfinal. Immediately after the artists concluded their performances, a number was shown which denoted the amount of jury members who liked the song, however the results were symbolic and did not affect the voting. In the superfinal, the winner, "" performed by Alvan and Ahez, was determined by the combination of public televoting and the ten-member jury. In addition to performing their contest entry, the twelve artists performed the song "Imagine" by John Lennon in support of the Ukrainian people affected by the Russian invasion of the country, preceded by a message from Ukrainian Eurovision Song Contest 2016 winner Jamala. Barbara Pravi, who represented France in the 2021 Contest, performed her song "" as the interval act of the show.

At Eurovision 
According to Eurovision rules, all nations with the exceptions of the host country and the "Big Five" (France, Germany, Italy, Spain and the United Kingdom) are required to qualify from one of two semi-finals in order to compete in the final; the top ten countries from each semi-final progress to the final. As a member of the "Big Five", France automatically qualified to compete in the final on 14 May 2022. France was set to perform in the first half of the final. In addition to its participation in the final, France was also required to broadcast and vote in one of the two semi-finals. This was decided via a draw held during the semi-final allocation draw on 25 January 2022, when it was announced that France would be voting in the first semi-final.

Voting

Points awarded to France

Points awarded by France

Detailed voting results
The following members comprised the French jury:
 Fabienne Moszer - Director of external relations of Accor Hotels Arena
 Jean-Philippe Lemonnier – Producer, Art director
 Maëva Raharisoa – Head of TV promotion at Mercury Records
 Mireille Dumas - Journalist, TV producer, presenter
 Moë Bennani - TV producer

Notes

References

External links 
 

2022
Countries in the Eurovision Song Contest 2022
Eurovision
Eurovision